Stanton Glacier is a glacier in Flathead National Forest in the U.S. state of Montana. The glacier is situated in a cirque on the northeast slope of Great Northern Mountain. Stanton Glacier is one of several glaciers that have been selected for monitoring by the U.S. Geological Survey's Glacier Monitoring Research program, which is researching changes to the mass balance of glaciers in and surrounding Glacier National Park (U.S.).

See also
List of glaciers in the United States

References

Glaciers of Flathead County, Montana
Glaciers of Montana